Bost Airport is an airport serving Lashkargah, a city in Helmand Province in Afghanistan.

History
The airport was established in 1957 with the assistance of the United States.

In 2008, a large project commenced to rehabilitate the current airport as well as to create an industrial and agricultural park. The overall budget of this project was US$52 million donated by USAID.

On 4 June 2009, the new runway and terminal were inaugurated by a delegation of high-ranking government officials and the ambassadors of the US and the UK. The new asphalt runway is 2,300m long and 43m wide which makes it the third longest runway in Afghanistan.

Airlines and Destinations

Facilities

See also
 List of airports in Afghanistan
 Camp Bastion

References

External links
 
 
 Airport record for Bost Airport at Landings.com.

Airports in Afghanistan
Buildings and structures in Helmand Province
1957 establishments in Afghanistan
Afghanistan–United States relations